W. H. Laverton's Ground is a historic cricket ground in Westbury, Wiltshire. The first recorded match on the ground was in 1888, when W. H. Laverton's XI played O. G. Radcliffe's XI. The ground hosted a single first-class match in 1890, which saw W. H. Laverton's XI playing the touring Australians.

Originally part of the grounds of Leighton House, which is today home to the Army Officer Selection Board, the field is now part of Wiltshire Council's Leighton Recreation Centre complex in Wellhead Lane, Westbury, and the Westbury & District Cricket Club is based there.

References

Buildings and structures in Wiltshire
Cricket grounds in Wiltshire
Sports venues in Wiltshire
Sports venues completed in 1888
Westbury, Wiltshire